Church of San Andrés may refer to:

Church of San Andrés (El Ciego)
Church of San Andrés (Madrid)
Church of San Andrés (Presencio)
Church of San Andrés Apóstol

See also
Iglesia de San Andrés (disambiguation)